Samtgemeinde Sögel is a Samtgemeinde in the district Emsland in Lower Saxony, Germany.

The following towns are located in Sögel:

Gallery

References 

Samtgemeinden in Lower Saxony

nl:Sögel